The WGC Invitational was a professional golf tournament that was held in the United States. Established in 1999 as a successor to the World Series of Golf, it was one of three or four annual World Golf Championships (WGC) until 2021, when the number of WGC events was reduced to two.

Under sponsorship agreements, the WGC Invitational was titled as the WGC-NEC Invitational (1999–2005) and the WGC-Bridgestone Invitational (2006–2018). During this time, it was hosted at Firestone Country Club in Ohio, except for 2002 when it was hosted at Sahalee Country Club in Washington.

The WGC Invitational was sanctioned and organized by the International Federation of PGA Tours and the prize money was official money on both the PGA Tour and the European Tour. Tiger Woods had the record number of wins with eight. The winner received a Wedgwood trophy called The Gary Player Cup.

Sponsorship
From 1999 through 2005, the WGC Invitational was sponsored by NEC.  NEC had also sponsored the World Series of Golf from 1984 to 1998.  The tournament changed sponsorship in 2006, with Bridgestone taking over as title sponsor. As a part of the sponsorship agreement, the event continued to be held at the South Course of Firestone Country Club in Akron, Ohio. In August 2013, the Bridgestone sponsorship was extended through 2018.

The 2018 event was the last held in Akron.  In 2019, FedEx became the title sponsor and relocated the tournament to Memphis, Tennessee.

Venues
Prior to 2019 the event was hosted at the South Course of Firestone Country Club in Akron, Ohio, with one exception – the 2002 event, which was played at Sahalee Country Club in Sammamish, Washington.  Between 2019 and 2021, the tournament was held at TPC Southwind in Memphis, Tennessee.

Qualifying criteria
The event had a field of about 75 players, roughly half the number for a standard professional golf event. Invitations were issued to the following:
Playing members of the last named Presidents Cup or Ryder Cup teams (whichever was played last).
Players ranked among the top 50 on the Official World Golf Ranking (one week and two weeks prior to event).
Tournament winners of worldwide events since the prior year's tournament with an Official World Golf Ranking Strength of Field Rating of 115 points or more.
The winner of one selected tournament from each of the PGA Tour of Australasia, Sunshine Tour and Asian Tour and two selected tournaments from the Japan Golf Tour.

From 1999 to 2001, only the Ryder Cup and Presidents Cup teams were eligible and the field was about 40 players. Prior to 2011, both Ryder Cup and Presidents Cup teams were eligible.

World Series of Golf

From 1976 through 1998, the PGA Tour event at Firestone Country Club was the "World Series of Golf," and was sponsored by NEC beginning in 1984. It was founded as a four-man invitational event in 1962, comprising the winners of the four major championships in a 36-hole event. the competitors played in one group for $75,000 in unofficial prize money, televised by NBC.

In 1976, it became a 72-hole, $300,000 PGA Tour event and its field was initially expanded to twenty; the victory and $100,000 winner's share went to Nicklaus. The largest first prize at a major in 1976 was $45,000 at the PGA Championship.

The World Series of Golf quickly became a leading event on the tour. For many years a victory in it gave a 10-year exemption on the PGA Tour, the same as was granted for a victory in a major championship at that time, and twice as long as is given even for winning a major now. The field consisted of the winners of all the high status men's professional golf tournaments around the world in the previous twelve months. This was quite different from the criteria for the WGC Invitational listed above, but produced much the same sort of global field.

Winners

Notes

References

External links

Coverage on the European Tour's official site

 
World Golf Championships
Former PGA Tour events
Former European Tour events
Golf in Ohio
Sports in Akron, Ohio
Recurring sporting events established in 1999
1999 establishments in Ohio
Bridgestone